The 1979 Speedway World Pairs Championship was the tenth FIM Speedway World Pairs Championship. The final took place in Vojens, Denmark. The championship was won by host Denmark (25 points) who beat England (24 points) and Poland (20 points).

Preliminary round
  Targoviste
 May 13

Semifinal 1
  Landshut
 June 9

Semifinal 2
  Ljubljana
 June 10

World final
  Vojens, Speedway Center
 June 26

 American Kelly Moran did not start, because he was injured at official practice. His replacement Steve Gresham failed to show up to the meeting and another replacement Ron Preston was stuck in England forcing Penhall to ride alone.

See also
 1979 Individual Speedway World Championship
 1979 Speedway World Team Cup
 motorcycle speedway
 1979 in sports

References

1979
World Pairs